Kazakh-British Technical University, or KBTU is a research and educational institution located in Almaty, Kazakhstan. It was founded in 2001.

About KBTU 

KBTU’s research is focused in the main sectors of the Kazakhstani economy – oil and gas, information technologies, banking and finance, management and telecommunications.

KBTU is the first and only Kazakhstani university with internationally accredited IT programs by the U.S. agency, the Accreditation Board for Engineering and Technology. It is also the first and only Kazakhstani university to receive an international accreditation for its oil and gas programs in the UK by the Institution of Marine Engineering, Science and Technology.

KBTU Business School is awarded international accreditation by the Accreditation Council of Business Schools and Programs.
The following KBTU programs are now ACBSP Accredited:

Undergraduate: Finance, Management;

Graduate: MBA in the Oil and Gas, MBA in Leadership, MBA in Finance, Financial Analysis, Supply and Project Management.

Quick Facts: 
 The only English-language Technical University in Kazakhstan
 100% classes are taught in English
 International faculty representing many cultures 
 KBTU hosts Central Asia's only marine academy, The Kazakhstan Maritime Academy (KMA)

Unique Features:

a)	KBTU has exceptionally strong, live links with business and industry. Business leaders sit at the University’s Advisory Board. Instead of having academic committees the KBTU has industrial committees at each of its school. These Committees are headed by business and industry leaders of national and international companies.

b)	Businesses advise on course design and content that is tailored to the industry needs. Many companies provide student grants and later hire KBTU graduates.
 
c)	Teaching staff also includes a large number of professionals who work for business and industry at international IT brands and oil and gas industry.
 
d)	Italy's energy giant Eni is working closely with KBTU. Eni professionals teach master's degree program in petroleum engineering. A new master's degree program in facility management will be launched in cooperation with Eni.
 
e)	KBTU has a new very practical MBA in digital media program which brings together business, IT, law and journalism education/training in a 12-month very intensive study program.
 
f)	KBTU IT faculty has the largest number of students. Some work at big companies and earn money and also receive academic credits for their work in the industry. Some full-time students attend classes in the evenings and on weekends. Thus students have the academic and practical experience at the same time.

g)	KBTU has several scientific institutes and labs where learned scientists work. Top scientists and researchers from the Soviet times work also work at KBTU’s scientific laboratories.

History 

The idea of creating Kazakh-British Technical University was conceived by the former President of the Republic of Kazakhstan, Nursultan Nazarbayev, who is now the leader of the nation. Further discussions on the establishment of the University were held during President Nazarbayev’s official visit to the United Kingdom in November 2000. A Memorandum of Understanding (MoU) was signed between the officials of the two countries on enhancing cooperation in education, science and technology fields.

The Kazakh-British Technical University JSC was established by the Government of the Republic of Kazakhstan on August 3, 2001 under Decree No. 1027 and in accordance with the MoU signed between the Ministry of Education and Science of the Republic of Kazakhstan and the British Council. The Ministry represented the Kazakh Government as the founder of the KBTU, while the British Embassy in Kazakhstan and the British Council represented the British side.

Since 2003, NC KazMunay Gas JSC has been the sole shareholder of KBTU JSC (Resolution of the Government of the Republic of Kazakhstan No. 987 dated September 26, 2003). However, in 2018, a Public Foundation “Education Fund of Nursultan Nazarbayev” purchased shares of the Kazakh-British Technical University. The privatization took place following the Government of Kazakhstan’s Privatization Program that was approved by a Government’s order No. 1141 on December 30, 2015.
 
Since 2005, KBTU is awarding double undergraduate degrees in partnership with the University of London. Under the program students receive London School of Economics and Political Science and KBTU degrees while studying at the KBTU in Almaty.

In 2010 – 2011, KBTU received 100 percent shares of two historical and prestigious scientific institutions of Kazakhstan, ‘A.B. Bekturov Institute of Chemical Sciences’ that was founded in 1945 and ‘D.V. Sokolsky Institute of Fuel, Catalysis and Electrochemistry’, which was established in 1969.

In 2018, within the framework of the privatization program, the block of shares of the Kazakh-British Technical University was purchased by the Public Fund Nursultan Nazarbayev Education Fund, in accordance with the Decree of the Government of the Republic of Kazakhstan No. 1141 dated 12/30/2015.

Partners and Sponsors

KazMunaiGas, KazTransOil, Kazakhstan Chinese Pipeline, Tengizchevroil, BG Group, BP, HSBC, Agip KCO, Kazakhstan Petroleum Association, Karachaganak Petroleum Operating, Repsol, Shell, Chevron Texaco, Schlumberger, Halliburton, PetroKazakhstan, Lloyd’s Register, Invenys, Statoil, KazEnergy, and Total S.A.

International links 

Dual-degree diploma programs with:
 London School of Economics, UK 
 Geneva Business School, Switzerland
 University of Northampton, UK
 IFP Energies Nouvelles, French Institute of Petroleum, France

Student exchange programs with:
 University Campus Suffolk, UK
 University of Northampton, UK
 Soongsil University, South Korea
 Sejong University, South Korea
 Asia Pacific University of Technology and Innovation, Malaysia
 Technological University of Malaysia

International Partners:
 In 2009 KBTU was awarded the “Affiliate Center” status by the University of London
 In 2011 KBTU became an official affiliate University with the Center for Strategy and Competitiveness at Harvard Business School
 Partnerships with more than 30 universities worldwide

Programs

References

External links 
Official website: Kazakh-British Technical University

Technical universities and colleges
Universities in Kazakhstan
Education in Almaty
Kazakhstan–United Kingdom relations